José Agustín "Tinti" Molina Becerra (August 28, 1873 - January 10, 1961) was a  baseball catcher, first baseman and manager in the Cuban League and Negro leagues. He played and managed from 1894 to 1931 with several ballclubs. He managed Almendares,  Habana, and the Cuban Stars (West). Molina was elected to the Cuban Baseball Hall of Fame in 1942.

A native of Key West, Florida, Molina was the father of fellow Negro leaguer Guillermo Molina.

References

External links

1873 births
1961 deaths
People from Key West, Florida
Cuban League players
Negro league baseball managers
Azul (baseball) players
Almendares (baseball) players
Cuban Stars (West) players
Cuban X-Giants players
Habana players
San Francisco (baseball) players
Baseball players from Florida
Baseball catchers
Baseball infielders
American emigrants to Cuba